West Newark School House is a historic church and school located at Newark Valley in Tioga County, New York.  It is of frame construction and designed in the Greek Revival style.  It was built in 1823-1824 as a combined school and church building by members of the West Newark Congregational Church.  It served this dual role until 1848 when it became used only as a school.  It functioned as a school until 1931.

It was listed on the National Register of Historic Places in 1998.

References

School buildings on the National Register of Historic Places in New York (state)
School buildings completed in 1824
Buildings and structures in Tioga County, New York
National Register of Historic Places in Tioga County, New York